
Gmina Sadki is a rural gmina (administrative district) in Nakło County, Kuyavian-Pomeranian Voivodeship, in north-central Poland.

Villages
Gmina Sadki contains the villages and settlements of Anieliny, Bnin, Broniewo, Dębionek, Dębowo, Glinki, Jadwiżyn, Kraczki, Liszkówko, Łodzia, Machowo, Mrozowo, Radzicz, Sadki, Samostrzel and Śmielin.

Neighbouring gminas
Gmina Sadki is bordered by the gminas of Kcynia, Łobżenica, Mrocza, Nakło nad Notecią and Wyrzysk.

See also
 Gmina Sadki Official Website

References
Polish official population figures 2006

Sadki
Nakło County